Alpac Capital is a Portuguese investment management firm which invests in European companies ranging from telecom operators, industrial and agribusiness companies to healthcare, mass media and renewable energy, among other businesses.

Operations 

It was founded in 2013 and is headquartered in Lisbon. Besides its global headquarters in Lisbon, the firm also has regional offices in Budapest and Dubai. Alpac Capital makes equity investments in order to achieve active involvement in the business development of its investees.

Key people
The CEO of Alpac Capital is Pedro Vargas David, a Portuguese businessman whose father is Mário David, a long-time associate, advisor and friend to Hungarian Prime Minister Viktor Orbán.

Investments by industry

Media
In December 2021, Alpac Capital signed an agreement to buy the controlling stake in Lyon-based broadcaster Euronews from Egyptian telecoms magnate Naguib Sawiris.

External links
Official website

References

Holding companies of Portugal
Investment management companies
Investment companies
Private equity firms
Venture capital firms